Freadelpha principalis is a species of beetle in the family Cerambycidae. It was described by Dalman in 1817, originally under the genus Lamia. It has a wide distribution in Africa.

Varieties
 Freadelpha principalis var. hilaris (Jordan, 1909)
 Freadelpha principalis var. picta (Waterhouse, 1886)

References

Sternotomini
Beetles described in 1817